Devendra Singh Lodhi is an Indian politician of the Bharatiya Janata Party. He is a member of the 18th Uttar Pradesh Assembly, representing the Syana Assembly constituency.

References 

1962 births
Living people
Place of birth missing (living people)
Bharatiya Janata Party politicians from Uttar Pradesh
Uttar Pradesh MLAs 2017–2022
Uttar Pradesh MLAs 2022–2027